Massieville is an unincorporated community in Ross County, in the U.S. state of Ohio.

History
Variant names were "Massie" and "Waller". The community has the name of Waller Massie, the proprietor of a local sawmill.

Notable person
Will Huff, a composer, was born at Massieville in 1875.

References

Unincorporated communities in Ross County, Ohio
Unincorporated communities in Ohio